The Women's individual normal hill/5 km competition at the FIS Nordic World Ski Championships 2021 was held on 27 February 2021.

Results

Ski jumping
The ski jumping part was held at 10:00.

Cross-country skiing
The cross-country skiing part was started at 15:30.

References

Women's individual normal hill/5 km